Gjirokastër County is one of the 12 counties of Albania. The total population in 2021 was 58,031, in an area of 2884 km². Its capital is the city Gjirokastër.

Administrative divisions
Until 2000, Gjirokastër County was subdivided into three districts: Gjirokastër, Përmet, and Tepelenë. Since the 2015 local government reform, the county consists of the following 7 municipalities: Dropull, Gjirokastër, Këlcyrë, Libohovë, Memaliaj, Përmet and Tepelenë. Before 2015, it consisted of the following 32 municipalities:

 Antigonë
 Ballaban
 Buz
 Çarshovë
 Cepo
 Dishnicë
 Dropull i Poshtëm
 Dropull i Sipërm
 Frashër
 Fshat Memaliaj
 Gjirokastër
 Këlcyrë
 Kordhocë
 Krahës
 Kurvelesh
 Lazarat
 Libohovë
 Lopës
 Luftinjë
 Lunxhëri
 Memaliaj
 Odrie
 Përmet
 Petran
 Picar
 Pogon
 Qendër Libohovë
 Qendër Piskovë
 Qendër Tepelenë
 Qesarat
 Sukë 
 Tepelenë
 Zagori 

The municipalities consist of about 270 towns and villages in total. See Villages of Gjirokastër County for a structured list.

Demographics
Its population includes a substantial Greek minority which in several places becomes a majority. According to the last national census from 2011 this county has 72,176 inhabitants. Ethnic groups in the county include Albanians, Greeks, Aromanians, Romani, & Balkan Egyptians.

According to the results of the 2011 census, 38.54% of the total population (27,815 people) declared themselves Muslim. There are also some Bektashi Muslims with 8.48% (6,118 people), 7.15% percent consisting of believers without a denomination (22,186 people) and Christians forming 19.65% of the county's population (Orthodox (17.43%) (15,295 people), Evangelists (0.08% (59 people) (and Roman Catholics) (2.07%) (1,493 people), while 10,094 (15,16%) did not answer at all.

Demographics history of Permet district
1904: According to German state archives, in 1904, the district of Premeti had 8,000 inhabitants, all Albanians, divided by 5,000 Muslims and 3,000 Christians.
1913: According to Mary Edith Durham, writing on 3 September 1913, the district of "Premeti" was "purely Albanian".
1918–19: According to Greece Before the Conference (1919), the kaza (Ottoman district) of Premeti had 15,138 Muslims, 10,823 Greeks, 888 Others; a total of 26,849.
1921: A 1921 document has the population divided by 12,780 Orthodox and 12,173 Muslims, a total of 25,043. Greek was spoken as a first language in few parts of the district. The northern part of the kaza was inhabited by Muslims.

Notable people
 Ali Pasha of Tepelenë
 Enver Hoxha
 Ismail Kadare
 Stath Melani
 Evangelos Zappas

References

Further reading

External links
 Gjirokastra Region Travel Guide

 
Counties of Albania